Cosman Family Cemetery is a historic family cemetery located near Middle Hope, New York, which is near Newburgh in Orange County, New York. The cemetery is the last feature remaining from the Cosman farmstead established in the mid-18th century.  It contains approximately 50 graves dating from about 1801 to 1930.

It was listed on the National Register of Historic Places in 2006.

References

External links
 

Cemeteries on the National Register of Historic Places in New York (state)
Cemeteries in Orange County, New York
National Register of Historic Places in Orange County, New York